The 2011 Humboldt State Lumberjacks football team represented Humboldt State University during the 2011 NCAA Division II football season. Humboldt State competed in the Great Northwest Athletic Conference (GNAC).

The 2011 Lumberjacks were led by fourth-year head coach Rob Smith. They played home games at the Redwood Bowl in Arcata, California. Humboldt State finished the season as champion of the GNAC with a record of nine wins and one loss (9–1, 7–1 GNAC). This was the first conference championship for the Lumberjacks since they won the Northern California Athletic Conference (NCAC) in 1995 and the nine wins was that highest since the 10-win 1968 Camellia Bowl championship team. The Lumberjacks averaged 35 points per game, outscoring their opponents 349–197 for the 2011 season.

Schedule

References

Humboldt State
Humboldt State Lumberjacks football seasons
Great Northwest Athletic Conference football champion seasons
Humboldt State Lumberjacks football